Herbert Maschke (2 September 1930 – 13 June 2000) was a German footballer.  He played in seven matches for the East Germany national football team from 1959 to 1962. Maschke played for SC Dynamo Berlin between 1954 and 1963. He won the FDGB-Pokal with SC Dyamo Berlin in 1959. He ended his playing career at SG Dynamo Hohenschönhausen.

References

External links
 

1930 births
2000 deaths
East German footballers
East Germany international footballers
Dynamo Dresden players
Berliner FC Dynamo players
Place of birth missing
Association footballers not categorized by position